The 2014 season is the 92nd season of competitive football in Ecuador.

Clubs in international competition

National teams

Senior team

FIFA World Cup

Ecuador qualified for 2014 FIFA World Cup, their third finals qualification.

Group stage

Ecuador were drawn into Group E with Switzerland, France, and Honduras. With a loss, a win, and a draw, Ecuador finished third in the group and did not advance to the Round of 16.

Friendlies

References

External links
Official website  of the Ecuadorian Football Federation 
2014 league seasons on RSSSF

 
2013